Emelyn Starr (born 11 November 1989) is an Australian former professional tennis player.

Her highest singles ranking is world No. 370, which she reached on 3 August 2009. Her career-high WTA ranking in doubles is No. 246, which she achieved on 4 October 2010.

ITF Circuit finals

Doubles (4–8)

External links
 
 
 

1989 births
Living people
Australian female tennis players
Tennis people from New South Wales
People from Tamworth, New South Wales
21st-century Australian women